The Women's 100 metres hurdles at the 2010 Commonwealth Games as part of the athletics programme was held at the Jawaharlal Nehru Stadium on Sunday 10 October and Monday 11 October 2010.

Records

Round 1
First 3 in each heat (Q) and 2 best performers (q) advance to the Final.

Wind Readings

Heat 1: +1.1 m/s, Heat 2: +0.9 m/s

Heat 1

Heat 2

Final
Wind: +0.9 m/s

External links
2010 Commonwealth Games - Athletics

Women's 100 metres hurdles
2010
2010 in women's athletics